Jelašnica may refer to:

 Jelašnica (Knjaževac), a village in Serbia
 Jelašnica (Leskovac), a village in Serbia
 Jelašnica (Niška Banja), a village in Serbia
 Jelašnica (Surdulica), a village in Serbia
 Jelašnica (Zaječar), a village in Serbia